Shiota (written: 塩田 or 潮田) is a Japanese surname. Notable people with the surname include:

, Japanese film director and screenwriter
, Japanese artist
, Japanese footballer
, Japanese baseball player
, Japanese handball player
, Japanese mathematician
, Japanese-American landscape architect

Fictional characters
, a character in the Assassination Classroom anime and manga

See also
Shiota, Saga, a former town in Saga Prefecture, Japan
6337 Shiota, a main-belt asteroid

Japanese-language surnames